Brachodes bellicosus is a moth of the family Brachodidae. It is found in north-western India and eastern Afghanistan.

The wingspan is about 24 mm. The forewings are grey with whitish scales. The hindwings are greyish brown.

References

Moths described in 1998
Brachodidae